The Data Stream Interface (DSI) is a session layer used to carry Apple Filing Protocol traffic over Transmission Control Protocol.

Overview 

When Apple introduced TCP with MacTCP and Open Transport in System 7 in the 1990s, they needed their file sharing protocol (AFP) to run on both TCP and AppleTalk.  They introduced AppleTalk Session Protocol (ASP) and DSI for TCP coincidentally with AFP 2.x.

DSI is implemented directly into AFP clients such as in Mac OS and afpfs-ng.

Protocol 

DSI is spoken between a client and an AFP server.  All DSI communication contains the following DSI header:

Packet structure 

The fields are:
 Flags: whether the packet is a request (0x00) or a reply (0x01)
 Command: one of 7 possible commands (see below)
 Request ID: a sequential identifier set on the request and copied in the reply
 Error code/ enclosed data offset:
 For requests, this is left as 0, except when using the DSIWrite command.
 For replies, this is an error code.
 Total data length: the entire length of data after the DSI header
 Reserved: for future expansion
 Payload: this is where limited DSI data or more commonly AFP header is placed

Commands

There are seven possible commands:

Requests and replies 

Upon receiving most DSI requests, the client or server sends a reply message.  This reply contains:
 the flags field set to 0x01 (reply)
 the command field set to the same value as the request's command field
 the same request ID sent in the request (used for the client to find the request being acknowledged)
 totalDataLength set to the payload length (if applicable).
 where applicable, the data payload itself following the DSI header.  (See the individual command for details.)

The DSITickle and DSICloseSession commands do not trigger a reply.

Session creation, maintenance and teardown 

A session is set up by the client sending a DSIOpenSession, which will include the size of the receive buffer the client has for packets (called the request quantum, typically 1024 bytes).  The server acknowledges the request and returns the size of its data receive buffer (typically 256k on Mac OS X Leopard).

Session closure can be initiated by either side by sending DSICloseSession. The sender does not need to wait for a reply and should immediately close the session after sending the message.

Maintaining the connection is done by tickling. DSI provides a mechanism for  ensuring that client and server know that the other is still active.  Every 30 seconds of inactivity, the server sends a tickle request to the client.  Similarly, the client also sends its own tickle. (This is NOT a response packet.)  Either the client or server can terminate the DSI session if they fail to hear from the other for 120 seconds.  The client may also disconnect if a request is in flight and neither a response nor tickle is received within 60 seconds (in Mac OS X v.10.2 and later).

Getting server information with GetStatus 

This DSI command encapsulates an FPGetSrvrInfo packet.  It is used by a client to get information from a server it isn't logged into.

The data elements are organized in the packet with a catalog of indices pointing to structured data.

The request to a DSIGetStatus request will cause the server to respond with the following information:
 flags for basic server characteristics
 server name (7-bit ASCII and UTF-8)
 signature: used to uniquely identify the server for other AFP transactions
 server type: typically "Macintosh" or "Netatalk"
 a list of strings describing AFP versions spoken (e.g. "AFP3.2")
 UAM list: a list of strings describing User Authentication Methods (e.g. "DHX2")
 a 64x64 pixel icon
 directory server list

DSIGetStatus reply format is identical to AFP's FPGetSrvrInfo and is used for ASPGetStatus.

Error codes

The error codes returned are AFP result codes.

Further research 

DSI is never documented separately, and is sufficiently simple and static that older references are suitable for modern implementations.  The concepts of DSI are identical to AppleTalk Session Protocol (ASP), and the overview in Inside AppleTalk, Second Edition can be helpful.

The most succinct guide is the "AFP over TCP" chapter of Apple Filing Protocol Programming Guide.

A significant source of information in understanding DSI can be found by analyzing communication between AFP clients and servers using a packet sniffer.

Footnotes

References 

 AppleTalk Filing Protocol Version 2.1 and 2.2 
 Inside AppleTalk 

 Apple Filing Protocol Programming Guide 
 Apple Filing Protocol Reference 

Apple Inc. software
Network protocols
Network file systems
Session layer protocols